William Peddie Lockhart (15 October 1835 – 12 August 1893) was a Scottish first-class cricketer and preacher.

Lockhart was born at Kirkcaldy in October 1835. He later moved to Liverpool where he was a merchant. He began his evangelical baptism in Liverpool at Hope Hall, which he rented on a weekly basis. Lockhart was regarded as one of the finest wicket-keepers of the North of England, he played his club cricket for Liverpool Cricket Club in the 1850s. He made his debut in first-class cricket for the North in the North v South fixture of 1857 at Nottingham. He made two first-class appearances in 1858 for the Gentlemen of the North against the Gentlemen of the South, before appearing twice for the Gentlemen of the North versus the Gentlemen of the South in 1859, in addition to playing for the Gentlemen in the Gentlemen v Players fixture. His final first-class appearance came for Another England Eleven against the England Eleven to North America in 1859 at Manchester. In seven first-class matches, he scored 65 runs and behind the stumps he took 8 catches and made 8 stumpings. Long after his first-class cricket career had finished, Lockhart was still a merchant preacher in Liverpool. Having outgrown Hope Hall, he moved to Hengler's Circus, where he welcomed the American evangelist Dwight L. Moody in 1867. Lockhart raised £7,000 in 1870 for the construction of Toxteth Baptist Tabernacle, opened by Charles Spurgeon in 1871. His mission was to convert the urban poor, but a critic of Lockhart's noted that his congregations mostly composed 'smug shopkeepers'. However, by 1886 his sermons were attracting roughly 1,500 people. He returned to Scotland in the 1890s, where he died in August 1893 at Ballater, Aberdeenshire.

References

External links

1835 births
1893 deaths
Sportspeople from Kirkcaldy
Scottish merchants
Scottish Baptist ministers
Scottish cricketers
North v South cricketers
Gentlemen of the North cricketers
Gentlemen cricketers
19th-century Scottish businesspeople